Sri Bhuvanendra College, Karkala, is an Arts, Science and Commerce College founded in 1960 and affiliated to the Mangalore University The management of the College is vested in Sri Bhuvanendra College Trust, a registered body and nominated by the Academy of general Education, Manipal.

See also
Karkala

External links
 Sri Bhuvanendra College, Karkala, Udupi District

Colleges in Karnataka
Universities and colleges in Udupi district
1960 establishments in Mysore State
Educational institutions established in 1960
Colleges of Mangalore University
Academy of General Education